Herbert Clyde Niles (September 10, 1880 – April 18, 1953) was an outfielder/infielder in Major League Baseball who played for four different teams between the 1906 and 1910 seasons. He was born in Buchanan, Michigan.

Career
Niles entered the majors in 1906 with the St. Louis Browns, playing for them two years before joining the New York Highlanders (1908), Boston Red Sox (1908–1910) and Cleveland Naps (1910). A valuable utility man and aggressive base runner, he scored 71 runs and stole 30 bases in his rookie season. Then, in 1907 hit career-numbers with a .289 and a .331 on-base percentage while collecting 65 runs and 19 steals, and in 1909 posted career-numbers in games (145), RBI (39) and extrabases (18).

On June 30, 1908, Nile was the only batter to reach base against Boston pitcher Cy Young. When batting leadoff for New York, Niles walked, then was caught stealing. Young retired the next 26 batters and had to settle for a no-hitter, rather than a perfect game. On August 30, 1910, New York's Tom Hughes took a no-hitter into the 10th inning before allowing a single to Niles, who was then playing for Cleveland.

In a five-season career, Niles was a .247 hitter (561-for-2270) with 12 home runs and 152 RBI in 608 games, including 278 runs, 58 doubles, 24 triples, 107 stolen bases, and a .310 on-base percentage. He made 582 appearances at second base (214), right field (184), left field (95), third base (52), center field (19) and shortstop (18). Niles died at the age of 72 in Sturgis, Michigan.

References

Further reading
New York Times obituary

External links

1880 births
1953 deaths
Boston Red Sox players
Cleveland Naps players
New York Highlanders players
St. Louis Browns players
Major League Baseball second basemen
Major League Baseball outfielders
Baseball players from Michigan
Binghamton Bingoes players
Birmingham Barons players
Toledo Mud Hens players
Indianapolis Indians players
St. Paul Apostles players
St. Paul Saints (AA) players
Kansas City Blues (baseball) players
People from Buchanan, Michigan